Coolacurragh Wood is a national nature reserve of approximately  located in County Laois, Ireland. It is managed by the Irish National Parks & Wildlife Service.

Features
Coolacurragh Wood was legally protected as a national nature reserve by the Irish government in 1982. It is very close to another nature reserve, Grantstown Wood and Grantstown Lough.

Coolacurragh Wood is a wet woodland, with rich base soils. The woodland is predominantly ash, alder and birch, with an under planting of hawthorn, meadowsweet, nettle and brambles. The reserve also has a lake which provides fish for otters, kingfishers and cormorants.

References

Geography of County Laois
Forests and woodlands of the Republic of Ireland
Nature reserves in the Republic of Ireland
Tourist attractions in County Laois